Varun Beverages Limited (VBL) is an Indian company that produces, bottles and distributes beverages. It is the second largest bottling company of PepsiCo's beverages in the world outside the United States. The company was incorporated in 1995 as a subsidiary of RJ Corp, and named after founder Ravi Jaipuria's son.

Apart from carbonated soft drinks of PepsiCo such as Pepsi, 7 Up, Mountain Dew and Mirinda, the company distributes Tropicana and Tropicana Slice fruit juice brands, Gatorade sports-themed beverages, Sting energy drinks, Duke's club soda, Lipton ready-to-drink ice tea, and Aquafina brand of bottled water. As of 2019, Varun Beverages is PepsiCo bottler in 27 states and 7 union territories of India. The company also distributes its products in Nepal, Sri Lanka, Morocco, Mozambique, Zambia and Zimbabwe.

In 2022, VBL entered into an agreement to manufacture Kurkure Puffcorn for PepsiCo India Holdings.

See also
 List of bottling companies

References

Companies based in Gurgaon
PepsiCo bottlers
Drink companies of India
Indian companies established in 1995
1995 establishments in Haryana
Food and drink companies established in 1995
Companies listed on the National Stock Exchange of India
Companies listed on the Bombay Stock Exchange